Lower Porthpean is a coastal hamlet in Cornwall, England, UK.

References

Hamlets in Cornwall